Zabukovje is a small settlement in the Municipality of Vojnik in eastern Slovenia. It lies in the hills north of Nova Cerkev. It is part of the traditional region of Styria. It is now included with the rest of the municipality in the Savinja Statistical Region.

References

External links
Zabukovje at Geopedia

Populated places in the Municipality of Vojnik